is a former professional Japanese baseball player. He played pitcher for the Yokohama DeNA BayStars.

References 

1991 births
Living people
Japanese baseball players
Nippon Professional Baseball pitchers
Yokohama DeNA BayStars players
Baseball people from Saitama Prefecture